Sanningasoq (old spelling: Sáningassoq) is a large oligotrophic twin lake in central-western Greenland, in the Qeqqata municipality. It is characteristic in that it is composed of two lakes connected via a narrow water passage through a broken isthmus.

Geography 

The 2x10 km twin lake is separated from the Akuliarusiarsuup Kuua valley and Kangerlussuaq in the south by a low tundra ridge − part of the Kangaamiut dike swarm. To the east lies a sibling Aajuitsup Tasia lake, separated from Sanningasoq by a low marshland isthmus of little relief. To the north-east lies the  Maniitsoq hill in the wide highland of Isunngua. The wide Tarajornitsut tundra highland lies to the west of the lake.

The surface of Sanningasoq is almost level with the surface of the neighboring Aajuitsup Tasia, both being in the ancient outflow path of Russell Glacier, and by extension, Sermersuaq, the Greenland Ice Sheet. The local depression part of which is occupied by the lake continues for several dozen kilometers in the west-north-western direction towards Sarfannguit and Sisimiut.

References

External links 
 Underwater photography in the sibling Aajuitsup Tasia at Tropica Aquarium Plants

Kangerlussuaq
Lakes of Greenland